Darwin! is the second studio album by Banco del Mutuo Soccorso, released in 1972 on the Ricordi label. It is a concept album about the birth and the evolution of life on Earth.

The album is highly rated by progressive rock fans as one of the top albums in the genre.

Track listing

Personnel
Pierluigi Calderoni - drums, timpani
Vittorio Nocenzi - organ, harpsichord, synthesizer
Renato D'Angelo - bass guitar, double bass
:it:Marcello Todaro - electric guitar, acoustic guitar, trumpet, backing vocals
Gianni Nocenzi - piano, clarinet
Francesco Di Giacomo - lead vocals

Produced by Alessandro Colombini
Engineered by Walter Patergnani

References

1972 albums
Banco del Mutuo Soccorso albums
Concept albums